For the record album of the same name, see Curtain Time.Curtain Time was a radio anthology program in the United States. It was broadcast on ABC, CBS Mutual, and NBC during the old-time radio era, beginning in 1938 and ending in 1950.

FormatCurtain Time was much like The First Nighter Program in that it simulated a theatrical environment "where listeners were invited to attend the evening's performance."

Versions

Pre-network
In 1935, Curtain Time was carried on WMAQ in Chicago, Illinois. By October 1937, it had moved to WGN, also in Chicago. An item in the trade publication Broadcasting in 1938 noted, "[I]t is understood that the show may be extended nationally in late summer."

1938–1939
Beginning October 14, 1938, Curtain Time was carried on the Don Lee network as well as on WGN. An item in Broadcasting reported that General Mills had begun a 52-week sponsorship of Curtain Time for its Korn Kix cereal.

Olan Soule, who later starred in a similar show, The First Nighter Program, usually had the male lead in this season's episodes. The female leads varied, but they included Betty Lou Gerson and Louise Fitch. Other cast members included Alice Hill. Don Gordon was the announcer, and Blair Walliser was the director. Henry Weber directed the music.

1945–1950
Harry Elders was the regular male lead, with Beverly Younger and Nannette Sergeant splitting durites as female leads in this iteration of Curtain Time, which was sponsored by Mars, Incorporated. It was carried on ABC July 4, 1945 – June 27, 1946, and on NBC July 13, 1946 – March 29, 1950. The program was also heard in Canada via 29 CBC Trans-Canada stations. During the 1946–1947 season, Canadian coverage moved "from 28 CBS Trans-Canada stations to 44 Dominion stations."

Others often heard in the cast were Betty Winkler, George Cisar, Beryl Vaughn, Sunda Love, Sidney Ellstrom, Maurice Copeland, and Michael Romano. Hosts included Patrick Allen, Vincent Pelletier, and Lew Valentine. Mike Wallace (billed as Myron Wallace) was the announcer. Norman Felton and Harry Holcomb were directors. Porter Heaps and Burt Farber were music directors.

See also
 Academy Award TheaterAuthor's PlayhouseBrownstone TheaterThe Campbell PlayhouseCavalcade of AmericaCBS Radio WorkshopFord TheatreGeneral Electric TheaterLux Radio TheatreThe Mercury Theatre on the AirThe Screen Guild TheaterScreen Director's Playhouse''

References 

1930s American radio programs
1940s American radio programs
1950s American radio programs
ABC radio programs
Mutual Broadcasting System programs
NBC radio programs
American radio dramas
Anthology radio series
1938 radio programme debuts
1950 radio programme endings